The Catoche FormationFormation is a geologic formation in Newfoundland and Labrador. It preserves fossils dating back to the Ordovician period.

See also 
 List of fossiliferous stratigraphic units in Newfoundland and Labrador

References 

Ordovician Newfoundland and Labrador
Ordovician southern paleotemperate deposits